The 2017 Lima Challenger was a professional tennis tournament played on clay courts. It was the eleventh edition of the tournament which was part of the 2017 ATP Challenger Tour. It took place in Lima, Peru between October 23 and October 29, 2017.

Singles main-draw entrants

Seeds

 1 Rankings are as of 16 October 2017.

Other entrants
The following players received wildcards into the singles main draw:
  Nicolás Álvarez
  Mauricio Echazú
  Emilio Gómez
  Juan Pablo Varillas

The following player received entry into the singles main draw using a protected ranking:
  Daniel Muñoz de la Nava

The following players received entry from the qualifying draw:
  José Hernández-Fernández
  Dimitar Kuzmanov
  Roberto Quiroz
  Blaž Rola

Champions

Singles

  Gerald Melzer def.  Jozef Kovalík 7–5, 7–6(7–4).

Doubles

  Miguel Ángel Reyes-Varela /  Blaž Rola def.  Gonçalo Oliveira /  Grzegorz Panfil 7–5, 6–3.

External links
Official Website

2017 ATP Challenger Tour
2017
October 2017 sports events in South America
2017 in Peruvian sport